On 6 November 2022, an attack on a police camp in the katcha neighbourhood of Ghotki, Sindh, resulted in the deaths of at least 7 police officials, including a DSP (district superintendent of police) and two SHOs (station head officers).

According to police, bandits attacked a police picket in Rawanti, a katcha area of Ghotki with rocket launchers. In the gun battle, seven cops embraced martyrdom including Abdul Malik Bhutto (DSP) and two SHOs.

The bandits seized possession of 10 police cars while holding 20 police officers hostage at the camp. As a result of the incident, reports claim that Sindh Rangers forces and police officers from around the area have been brought in to conduct operations against the dacoits.

Bilawal Bhutto Zardari, the leader of the Pakistan People's Party (PPP) and the country's foreign minister, has strongly condemned an attack.

References

2022 in Pakistan
November 2022 events in Pakistan
Ghotki District
Attacks on police stations in the 2020s
2022 crimes in Pakistan
2022 in Sindh
2020s crimes in Sindh
November 2022 crimes in Asia